Driftwood Beach State Recreation Site is a state park administered by the Oregon Parks and Recreation Department in the U.S. state of Oregon. It is fee-free and open year-round. 	

The  park between U.S. Highway 101 and the ocean has parking spaces from which visitors can watch winter-storm surf without leaving their cars. A path leads from the bluff to a wide beach with driftwood along the high-tide line. Kite flyers and beachcombers frequent the beach in sunny weather. The Oregon Coast Trail for long-distance hikers passes through the park.

It was used as a filming location for the upcoming 2023 film adaptation of the stage musical version of The Color Purple.

See also
 List of Oregon state parks

References

State parks of Oregon
Parks in Lincoln County, Oregon